Begoña García may refer to:

Begoña García Piñero (born 1976), Spanish basketball player
Begoña García Grau (born 1995), Spanish field hockey player